Garudiya or garudhiya (ގަރުދިޔަ) is a clear fish broth. It is one of the basic and traditional food items of Maldivian cuisine. The broth is based on tuna species found in the nation's ocean waters such as skipjack (kanḍumas or goḍa), yellowfin tuna (kanneli), little tunny (lațți), or frigate tuna (raagonḍi).

Despite the introduction of new items in the Maldivian cuisine, garudiya is still a Maldivian favourite as it has been for generations.

Preparation
In order to cook garudiya, tuna fish are cut up following a traditional pattern. After having had the gills and some of the innards thrown away, the fish pieces, the heads and the bones are carefully washed. The fish is then boiled in water with salt, until it is well cooked. The foam or scum (filleyo) is carefully removed while boiling and is later discarded.

Garudiya is usually eaten with steamed rice, but it can also be eaten with roshi, the Maldivian chapati. When eaten with steamed taro (Alocasia and Colocasia), or with steamed breadfruit, grated coconut is added.

Variants and derivatives
Sometimes  Maldivians use chilies, curry leaves and onions to flavor the garudiya according to their taste, however, mostly this broth is cooked simply using fish, salt and water.

Kekki garudiya is a variant of garudiya with spices.

Garudiya could be also obtained using other fishes like wahoo (kurumas), mahi-mahi (fiyala) or bluefin jack (handi), among others, but the favored fish for garudiya is tuna and related species.

When the tuna-based garudiya is cooked until all the water evaporates, it forms a thick brown paste known as rihaakuru that is highly valued in the Maldivian diet.

See also
Maldive fish
 List of tuna dishes

References

Maldivian cuisine
Food ingredients
Tuna dishes
National dishes